Fabrice Fokobo Atud (born 25 January 1994) is a Cameroonian footballer who currently plays for El Paso Locomotive in the USL Championship. He can play both as centre back or defensive midfielder.

Club career
On 9 January 2013, Fabrice made his debut with Sporting B in a 2012–13 Segunda Liga match against Belenenses.

On 2 March 2013, Fabrice made his  debut with Sporting Clube de Portugal in a 2012–13 Primeira Liga match against FC Porto

On 1 January 2019, Fabrice was released from his contract at Sporting Clube de Portugal.

Fabrice joined El Paso Locomotive of the American second division USL Championship in January 2020. He was released by El Paso in August 2020 without making an appearance.

References

External links
 
 Stats and profile at LPFP 
 

1994 births
Living people
Association football defenders
Association football midfielders
Cameroonian footballers
Cameroonian expatriate footballers
People from Buea
Sporting CP B players
Cameroonian expatriate sportspeople in Portugal
Cameroon youth international footballers
Expatriate footballers in Portugal
Expatriate footballers in Greece
Cameroonian expatriate sportspeople in Greece
Expatriate soccer players in the United States
Cameroonian expatriate sportspeople in the United States
El Paso Locomotive FC players